Joachim Marscheider (born 2 March 1930) is a German former sports shooter. He competed in trap shooting at the 1964 Summer Olympics.

Olympic Games
1964 Summer Olympics in Tokyo, competing for the United Team of Germany:
 Shooting – Men's trap – 8th place

References

External links
 
  

1930 births
Possibly living people
German male sport shooters
Olympic shooters of the United Team of Germany
Shooters at the 1964 Summer Olympics
People from Saxony-Anhalt